Bibikkan is a traditional Sri Lankan coconut cake. It is a dark moist cake made of shredded coconut, jaggery (from the sap of the toddy palm) and semolina combined with a mixture of spices. Bibikkan is commonly prepared and consumed in celebration of festive and religious occasions, including Christmas, New Year's Eve, Sinhala and Tamil New Year.

Origins and history
Bibikkan is believed to have been introduced to Sri Lanka by the Portuguese, who colonised the coastal areas of the island in 1505 and remained until 1658. Goan Catholics serve a similar dish called Bebinca, which is almost identical to Bibingka, a traditional Filipino rice flour cake made with coconut milk, which is served on Christmas Day. Historically the Mount Lavinia area has been associated with the production of Bibikkan, known locally as Poranu appa.

Description
The main ingredients of bibikan are jaggery, an unrefined syrup from the sap of the Kithul palm tree, which has a rich flavour between caramel and molasses; dry roasted semolina (Uppama) or rice flour; and grated or shredded coconut.

To make the dish, the semolina is dry roasted, the jaggery dissolved in hot water and brought to boil, to which the shredded coconut is added. The mixture is then allowed to cool before adding the semolina, cardamom, nutmeg, mace, ginger preserve, candied fruit peel, cashew nuts, salt, baking powder and Sri Lankan cinnamon which is then blended thoroughly. Separate eggs whisking the whites and yolks separately. Add the egg yolks and mix well. Add the lime rind and fold in the egg whites. Pour into a buttered baking tray and bake in a moderate oven. Leave to cool and cut into squares to serve.

See also 
 Cuisine of Sri Lanka
 List of cakes
 List of coconut dishes

References

Sri Lankan desserts and sweets
Foods containing coconut
Sinhalese New Year foods
Christmas cakes
Semolina dishes